The 1982 Dutch Open was a Grand Prix tennis tournament staged in Hilversum, Netherlands. The tournament was played on outdoor clay courts and was held from 19 July until 25 July 1982. It was the 26th edition of the tournament. Balázs Taróczy won his fifth consecutive title at the event and his sixth in total.

Finals

Singles
 Balázs Taróczy defeated  Buster Mottram 7–6, 6–7, 6–3, 7–6

Doubles
 Jan Kodeš /  Tomáš Šmíd defeated  Heinz Günthardt /  Balázs Taróczy 7–6, 6–4

References

External links
 ITF tournament edition details

Dutch Open (tennis)
Dutch Open (tennis)
Dutch Open
Dutch Open
Dutch Open (tennis), 1982